Mohamed al-Atifi is the Defense minister of  the Houthi government from 28 November 2016.

References 

Living people
Yemeni politicians
Year of birth missing (living people)
People of the Yemeni Civil War (2014–present)
Yemeni Military Academy alumni